Speed Track is a 2007 Indian Malayalam-language sports film directed by S. L. Puram Jayasurya, starring Dileep, Gajala, Riyaz Khan and Madhu Warrier in the lead roles.

Plot
The movie begins with the selection of new students in BCM College which is famous for sports and athletics. Arjun is a young athlete who is all set to create history with his speed and spirits. He is going through tough times, mentally and financially following his father's demise. He has got a share of tension for his family who badly needs him to keep them going. Arjun joins BCM College for the new academic year, but evermore he has some specific tasks and targets in behalf of joining the college.

Everyone in the campus except Tinu, who was the unchallenged hero hailing from bigger family, welcomed Arjun's talents as he beats Tinu's record in high jump.

Arjun who makes consistent performances on the track puts Tinu on the back seat and Arjun becomes the heartthrob of many within a short time. These defeats were more than something Tinu could handle and started taking it on Arjun on a very personal level apart from sporting spirits. This leads to nasty street fights between the two which results in the principal calling both of them for talks. The principal challenges them both to take it on the field rather than going at each other. Both prepare to settle the score in the big race that follows. At the end of the movie, Anil, Arjun's brother who is unable to walk is seen playing basketball.

Cast

Production
Speed Track is considered as the first sports film in the Malayalam cinema. The film was first decided to be named Fast Track.

Soundtrack 
Deepak Dev composed music for the movie and Ouseppachan did the background score.

Critical response
The film received mixed to positive response from the audience. The film was released on 2 March 2007, ran almost 75 days.

References

External links
 

2000s Malayalam-language films
Indian sports films
2007 films
2007 action films